Ben Seymour (born 1 September 1990) is an Australian rugby union footballer. His usual playing position is as a  fly-half. He currently represents the Western Force in Super Rugby. He made his debut for the franchise in Round 2 of the 2012 Super Rugby season against the Reds in Brisbane.

External links 
Western Force profile
itsrugby.co.uk profile

Living people
1990 births
Australian rugby union players
Rugby union fly-halves
Western Force players
SU Agen Lot-et-Garonne players
Northland rugby union players
Rugby union players from Napier, New Zealand